Russell David Gray is a New Zealand evolutionary biologist and psychologist working on applying quantitative methods to the study of cultural evolution and human prehistory. In 2020, he became a co-director of the Max Planck Institute for Evolutionary Anthropology in Leipzig. Although originally trained in biology and psychology, Gray has become well known for his studies on the evolution of the Indo-European and Austronesian language families using computational phylogenetic methods.

Gray also performs research on animal cognition. One of his main research-projects studies tool-use among New Caledonian crows.

Career 

Gray completed his Ph.D. at the University of Auckland in 1990. He spent four years lecturing at the University of Otago, New Zealand, before returning to the School of Psychology at the University of Auckland. He is a Fellow of the Royal Society of New Zealand and has been awarded with several fellowships, as well as the inaugural Mason Durie Medal [in 2012] for his pioneering contributions to social science.[] In 2014, he became one of the two founding directors of the Max Planck Institute for the Science of Human History in Jena, Germany, where he has been heading the Department of Linguistic and Cultural Evolution [until it moved to Leipzig in 2020]. He also holds adjunct positions in the School of Psychology at the University of Auckland and the Department of Philosophy at the Australian National University.

Gray's doctoral thesis was titled Design, constraint and construction: essays and experiments on evolution and foraging.

References

External links
Official faculty page

Video
 Video on Russell Gray's research (Latest Thinking)

Evolutionary biologists
Computational linguistics researchers
Linguists of Austronesian languages
Academic staff of the University of Auckland
Living people
Year of birth missing (living people)
Max Planck Institute for the Science of Human History
Max Planck Institute for Evolutionary Anthropology
Phylogenetics researchers